Carrozzeria Ghia SpA (established 1916 in Turin) is an Italian automobile design and coachbuilding firm, established by Giacinto Ghia and Gariglio as "Carrozzeria Ghia & Gariglio". The headquarters are located at Corso Guglielmo Marconi, 4, Turin. The company is currently owned by Ford Motor Company and focused on the European market through Ford's subsidiary in the region.

Through the years, Ghia has produced many bodies for several automobile manufacturers such as Alfa Romeo, Chrysler, Ferrari, Fiat, Ford, Jaguar, and Volkswagen.

History 

Ghia initially made lightweight aluminium-bodied cars, achieving fame with the Alfa Romeo 6C 1500, winning Mille Miglia (1929). Between the world wars, Ghia designed special bodies for Alfa Romeo, Fiat, and Lancia, one of the most famous was the Fiat 508 Balilla sports coupe (1933). The factory was rebuilt at Via Tomassi Grossi, after being demolished in an air raid during World War II (1943).
After Ghia's death (1944), the company was sold to Mario Boano and Giorgio Alberti. The Ghia-Aigle subsidiary was established in Aigle, Switzerland (1948).

Following differences between Boano and the company's Naples-born chief engineer and designer Luigi Segre, Boano left the company in 1953 and ownership passed to Segre in 1954. Under the ownership of Luigi Segre, between 1953 and 1957, Giovanni Savonuzzi became Direttore Tecnico Progettazione e Produzione Carrozzerie e Stile and established Ghia as the most influential proponent of that Italian styling that came to define automobile design trends worldwide. The decade between 1953 and 1963 saw many foreign firms ordering Ghia designs, such as Ford (the Lincoln Futura concept car), Volkswagen (the Karmann Ghia), and Volvo. Chrysler and its designer Virgil Exner became a close partner for 15 years, resulting in eighteen Chrysler Ghia Specials (1951–53), the K-310, the Chrysler Norseman, the Imperial Crown limousines (whose notable owners included Jackie Kennedy and Nelson Rockefeller), and others. There are even a few Ghia-bodied Ferraris. Ghia also participated in the short-lived Dual-Ghia venture. Production by Ghia was always in very low numbers, giving the company's products even greater exclusivity than those of the other Italian coachbuilders.

In June 1953, Pierre Lefaucheux, Renault's chairman, requested Carrozzeria Ghia assistance with the Renault Dauphine.

In 1953, Boano left for Fiat, the factory moved to via Agostino da Montefeltro, and Luigi Segre took over. Ghia then brought in Pietro Frua, appointing Frua as head of Ghia Design (1957–60), designing the Renault Floride. After Segre's death in 1963, Ghia was sold to Ramfis Trujillo in 1966, who in turn sold the company in 1967 to Alejandro de Tomaso, owner of a rival design house. De Tomaso had difficulty in running Ghia profitably. In 1970, he sold his shares to the Ford Motor Company. During this transition period, Ghia had partial involvement in the De Tomaso Pantera, a high-performance, mid-engine car using a Ford V8.

From then on, the Ghia studios were an integral part of Ford of Europe's styling operation - producing mostly concept cars although some production models were styled by the firm - the most notable being the Ford Fiesta Mk1 in 1976, which was penned by Ghia's Tom Tjaarda. Aside from this, the most publicly visible sign of Ford's ownership of Ghia has been its use of the name to denote the luxury trim level of its European models for many years (below).

Ghia L6.4 

After the Dual-Ghia project had ended, the more up-to-date Ghia L6.4 appeared in 1961. Fewer Mopar parts were used, but the car's bespoke nature meant an astronomically high price and when production ended in 1963 only 25 (or 26) cars had been built. The car's  Chrysler V8 has  SAE, and suspension and transmission parts were also hand-picked from Chrysler's production line. Both the front and the rear seats consist of separate buckets.

The Ghia name 
From 1973, the Ghia name became Ford's top trim-level in its mainstream model range. The trend began in Europe and North America (Mustang II, Granada, Capri, Cortina, Escort, and later Fiesta, Sierra, Orion, Scorpio, Mondeo, Focus all had Ghia trim levels), but soon spread worldwide, particularly to the South American (with the Argentinian Ford Falcon and Taunus, the Brazilian Ford Del Rey and versions of Escort, Focus and Mondeo) and Asia Pacific markets (with the Ford Laser, Fairmont, Fairlane and Telstar). One notable exception to this convention was the Scorpio model in the United Kingdom, which was essentially a rebadged Granada Mk3, slotting in above the Ghia in the model lineup. This lasted until the major facelift of 1994, when the Granada name was dropped and replaced by Scorpio for all variants, at which point the Ghia model resumed its position at the top of the range.

In the British market, however, the practice of using the Ghia name in such a capacity was finally phased out in 2010. The Titanium name has instead replaced Ghia as the flagship trim level, and is now used globally across all of Ford's markets to denote the top trim level. The British Ford Fiesta retained the Ghia trim designation for the longest period of any model: 31 years 8 months, uninterrupted, from February 1977 to November 2008. In the rest of Europe, the Ghia trim was discontinued as well. Starting from 2013, the Vignale branding started being used by Ford to designate the top trim levels. The Ghia studios has produced various concept cars under the Ford banner.

Ghia cars 

 1929 Alfa Romeo 6C 1500
 1933 Fiat 508 Balilla sports coupé
 1947 Alfa Romeo 6C 2500
 1950 Alfa Romeo 6C 2500 SS Supergioiello
 1950 Ferrari 195 Inter coupé
 1951 Ferrari 212 Inter coupé
 1951 Renault Frégate
 1952 Chrysler Special Coupé
 1953 Abarth 1100 Sport Ghia Coupé
 1953 Fiat 8V Supersonic
 1953 Cadillac Series 62 Coupe by Ghia
 1953 Alfa Romeo 1900 Supersonic 'Conrero'
 1954 Alfa Romeo 1900 Coupe
 1954 Dodge Firearrow III Sports Coupé
 1954 Fiat 8V Coupé
 1954 Jaguar XK120 Supersonic
 1955 Jaguar XK140 Coupé
 1955 Lincoln Futura
 1955 Volkswagen Karmann Ghia
 1956 Aston Martin DB2/4 Supersonic
 1956 Chrysler Norseman
 1956 Chrysler Plainsman Two-door Station Wagon
 1956 Renault Dauphine
 1957 Dual Ghia Convertible
 1958 Alfa Romeo Giulietta Sprint Veloce prototype
 1958 Renault Caravelle
 1961 Ghia L6.4 
 1961 Volvo P1800
 1963 Ghia 1500 GT 
 1963 Ghia G230S (based on Fiat 2300)
 1963 Chrysler Turbine Car
 1966 Ghia 450 
 2006 Ford Focus Ghia

Notable designers

 Giacinto Ghia
 Mario Boano
 Luigi Segre
 Giovanni Michelotti
 Pietro Frua
 Giovanni Savonuzzi
 Giorgetto Giugiaro
 Sergio Sartorelli
 Tom Tjaarda
 Filippo Sapino

Gallery

References

External links

 Ghia - overview and models on Coachbuild.com
 An enthusiast site on Ghia history (archived)

Ghia
Ford of Europe
Design companies established in 1915
Italian companies established in 1915
Italian brands
Vehicle manufacturing companies established in 1915
Italian companies disestablished in 2001
Vehicle manufacturing companies disestablished in 2001